Iris is a Romanian rock band established in February 1977 by Ioan 'Nelu' Dumitrescu (drums), Ion 'Nuțu' Olteanu (lead solo guitar and vocals) and Emil Lechințeanu (bass guitar). They achieved success, followed by tours throughout Romania and recordings for radio broadcast. At the 2006 MTV Romania Music Awards, Iris won the Best Rock Award and were nominated for Best Band and Best Live Act.

History 
Iris began in 1975-1976 with Emil Lechințeanu, Ioan 'Nelu' Dumitrescu and Ion 'Nuțu' Olteanu. Through the years, the band has experienced many line-up changes. In 45 years of activity, Iris became one of the biggest names in Romanian music history. First appearance on an album was in 1978 with the song "Corabia cu pânze" on "Formații de muzică pop III" compilation album. At the beginning of the 1980s, Ioan 'Nelu' Dumitrescu, Ion 'Nuțu' Olteanu (guitar) and Cristian 'Cristi' Minculescu, who are still present in the current line-up, played with Florin Ochescu (guitar) and Mihai 'Marty' Popescu (bass guitar). Together they released a debut-album, Iris I, which included songs that became some of the most popular Romanian rock songs: "Doar pentru voi" ("Only for You"), "Trenul fără naș" ("The Train without a Ticket-Collector"), "Pe ape" ("On Water"), and "Cei ce vor fi" ("Those to Come").

In 1987, Iris II was released with an extravagant cover depicting the communist regime, a cover which represented one of Cristian 'Cristi' Minculescu's idols, Angus Young, "in action".  The band's line-up was Cristian 'Cristi' Minculescu (vocal), Ioan 'Nelu' Dumitrescu (drums), Valter Popa (guitar), Mihai Alexandru (guitar, vocal) and Doru 'Boro' Borobeică (bass guitar). On this album, notable songs included "Strada ta" ("Your Street"), "În parc" ("In the Park"), and "Zi și noapte" ("Day and Night").

One year later, Iris released its third album, Nu te opri ("Don't Stop"), which featured the same line-up as Iris II. The disc contained eight tracks, but the most important are "Floare de iris" ("Iris Flower"), "Uită tot ce‑a fost" ("Forget All That Was"), "Eu și cu tine" ("Me and You"), "Ploaia de vise" ("Rain of Dreams").

In December 1989, when the downfall of the Romanian communist regime began, Iris recorded the album Iris IV in Tomis Studio, without Mihai Alexandru, but with Cristian 'Cristi' Minculescu, Ion 'Nuțu' Olteanu, Doru 'Boro' Borobeică and Valter Popa. Hits from this album include "De ce oare ai plecat?" ("Why Did You Leave Me?"), "Vino iar" ("Come Again"), "Rock and roll", and "Cine mă strigă în noapte?" ("Who Is Calling Me in the Night?").

In 1992, Iris held an anniversary concert called Iris 15 ANI ("Iris 15 years") at Sala Polivalentă in Bucharest in front of 10,000 people. This was a record audience for a Romanian band, unequalled since that time. That same year, at the Cannes Festival, Iris won second place in the rock section and they appeared on MTV.

The fifth Iris album was named 1993 and was recorded with the Iris IV line-up, plus guitarist Dan Alex Sârbu. Iris played in Italy and on the Malboro Tour, in the big cities of Romania. In July 1996, following Dorian Ciubuc's idea, Iris signed a contract with Polygram for 6 years. In this time, Iris recorded 6 albums. In October 1998, they released Mirage, an album with a union of tracks and orchestration. The album was co-authored with Mihai Godoroja.

In 1997 on October 17, Iris celebrated 20 years of existence with a live performance in Bucharest, featuring both active and former band members. Three weeks later, the band released a celebratory album entitled "20 DE ANI" (20 years). The album has 13 tracks from the live concert: "Pământul îl cuprind", "Călătorul", "Trenul fără naș", "Speranța", "Iris, nu pleca", "Pe ape", "Mirage", "Cine mă strigă în noapte", "Valuri", "Floare de iris", "Tot zbor", "Baby", "Somn bizar".

In 2000 the band began the largest tour ever undertaken by a Romanian band. The "mega-tour", as it was known, was named ATHENAEUM. The band also released an album of the same name. Two years later, DIGITAL ATHENAEUM, a DVD featuring recordings of concerts on the tour, was released. In 2002, the "Iris 25 Years" concert gathered thousands in the biggest concert hall in the country. The next album, Mătase albă ("White Silk") featured ballads, such as "Iubire fără de sfârșit" ("Endless Love") and a cover version of "Lady in Black" by Uriah Heep, which won an MTV Music Award. This album was followed by 4Motion and, in 2005, Iris Maxima. The most notable ballad on Iris Maxima is "Vino pentru totdeauna" ("Come Back for Always").

On October 5, 2007, the band was honored by Romanian president Traian Băsescu for 30 years of contributions to Romanian culture. On the same day, the band performed in a live show in the front of over 15,000 fans.

In 2009, frontman Cristian 'Cristi' Minculescu underwent a liver transplant. The costs of the surgery was partly covered by the Romanian Ministry of Health. The minister of health at the time, Ion Bazac, stated: "It is a sign of respect and gratitude for an artist who has delighted our souls".

On October 8, 2009, the band performed in the first big concert after the liver transplant. On the occasion of this live performance, Integral Iris, a boxset comprising the band's entire discography, was released.

On 22 June 2012 Iris held an anniversary concert in Piața Constituției, marking release os album "Iris 35". At spectacle was presented multimedia projections with moments from band history, and soprano Felicia Filip sang Iris melody “De vei pleca”.

On September 3, 2012, Minculescu, who had been with the band since 1980, stepped down and was replaced by Tony Șeicărescu. On 25 June 2013 Toni Șeicărescu left the group, on the background of some disagreements with Ioan 'Nelu' Dumitrescu, being replaced by Rafael Cătălin Paul Ciobotaru. In April 2015, Cristian 'Cristi' Minculescu returned to Iris.

In 2017, Cristi Minculescu, Valter Popa, and Doru "Boro" Borobeica leave the band. A year after their departure (2018), Nelu Dumitrescu (the drummer) registers the name of the band "Iris" as a trade mark. The trio (Cristi, Valter, and Boro) go to court and ask for the cancellation of the trade mark "Iris" arguing that the respective the trade mark was registered by Nelu Dumitrescu without their approval.  

In June, 2020, the Romanian court decided that the trade mark "Iris" will be used from hereon by both parties. The court mentions that the trade mark will no longer be called "Iris" but "Iris" together with the name of each member of the band (their first and/or last names). Currently the 2 bands have changed their names and trade marks as following: "Iris—Cristi Minculescu & Valter & Boro" and "Iris—Nelu Dumitrescu". Currently, in Romania, there is no band registered with the trade mark "Iris" only.

Members

Current members 

Iris—Nelu Dumitrescu 
 Ioan 'Nelu' Dumitrescu – drums, percussion, backing vocals (1977-1980, 1981 - present)
 Ion 'Nuțu' Olteanu – guitar, vocals (1977-1980, 1981-1986, 2017 - present)
 Aurelian 'Relu' Marin – keyboards, piano, backing vocals (2002 - present)
 Constantin 'Costi' Sandu – lead vocals (2017 - present)
 Matei Cioca – guitar, backing vocals (2019 - present)
 Tibi Duțu – bass (2021 - present)
 Cristi Lucian Dumitrescu – drums, percussion (2017 - present)

Iris—Cristi Minculescu & Valter & Boro 

 Cristian 'Cristi' Minculescu – lead vocals (1980-1982, 1983, 1985-2012, 2015 - present)
 Doru Borobeică 'Boro' – bass, backing vocals (1984-1988, 1988 - present)
 Valter Popa – guitar, backing vocals (1986 - present)
 Mihai Dumitrescu  – drums, percussion (2017 - present)

Former members 

 Emil 'Brando' Lechințeanu – bass (1977-1978)
 Sorin Chifiriuc – guitar, bass, vocals (1978-1980)
 Ion 'Nelu' Jecan – lead vocals (1978)
 Lucian Chivu – lead vocals (1978-1980)
 Mihai 'Marty' Popescu – bass (1979-1980, 1981-1984)
 Anton Hașiaș – bass (1980-1981)
 Clement Iordănescu – guitar (1980)
 Florin Ochescu – guitar (1980, 1982-1984)
 Adrian George Ilie – guitar, backing vocals (1980-1982, 1984-1985)
 Gelu Ștefan – drums (1980)
 Valeriu Neamțu 'Gălăgie' – drums (1980-1981)
 Nicky Dinescu – drums (1981)
 Marin Iliescu – bass (1981)
 Gelu Vintilă – guitar (1981)

 Dan Bădulescu – guitar (1982)
 Geo Stănică – lead vocals (1982)
 Sanda Lăcătușu – lead vocals (1982-1983)
 Dan Bittman – lead vocals (1984-1985)
 Bogdan Stănescu – guitar (1985-1986)
 Mihai Alexandru – guitar, backing vocals (1986-1989)
 Nelu Popovici – bass (1988)
 Dan Alex Sârbu – guitar (1989-1990, 1990-1994)
 Manuel Savu – guitar (1990)
 Tony Șeicărescu – lead vocals (2012-2013)
 Rafael (Cătălin Paul Ciubotaru) – lead vocals (2013-2015)
 Alin Moise – guitar (2017-2018) 1
 Andrei Bălașa – guitar (2018-2019) 1
 George Costinescu – bass (2017-2019) 1
 Daniel Moroiu – bass (2019-2021) 1
Note: 1 – former member of Iris—Nelu Dumitrescu

Discography

Studio albums 
 Iris I (LP, Electrecord, 1984)
 Iris II (LP/MC, Electrecord, 1987)
 Iris III – Nu te opri! (Iris III – Don't Stop!) (LP/MC, Electrecord, 1988)
 Iris IV (LP/MC, Electrecord, 1990)
 Iris 1993 (LP/MC, Electrecord, 1993)
 Lună plină (Full Moon) (CD/MC, Zone Records, 1996) 
 Mirage (CD/MC, Zone Records, 1998)
 Iris 2000 (CD/MC, Zone Records, 1999)
 Mătase albă (White Silk) (CD/MC, Zone Records, 2002)
 I.R.I.S. 4Motion (4xCD/4xMC, Zone Records, 2003)
 Iris Maxima (CD/MC, Zone Records, 2005)
 Cei ce vor fi – Vol. I (Those Who Will Be – Vol. I) (CD/MC, Roton, 2007)
 Cei ce vor fi – Vol. II (Those Who Will Be – Vol. II) (CD/MC, Roton, 2007)
 12 porți (12 Gates) (CD/MC, Roton, 2010)
 O lume doar a lor – 35 de ani (A World Only for Themselves – 35 Years) (CD, Cat Music, 2012)
 Lumea toată e un circ (All the World Is a Circus) (CD/2xLP, MediaPro Music & Universal Music România, 2018)
 Zodiac (CD/LP, MediaPro Music & Universal Music România, 2022)

Maxi-singles 
 Casino (CD/MC, Zone Records, 1999)
 De vei pleca... (If You Went Away...) (CD/MC, Zone Records, 2000) (featuring Felicia Filip)
 Da, da, eu ştiu! (Oh, Yes, I Know!) (CD/MC, Zone Records, 2002)

Live albums 
 Iris 20 de ani (Iris 20 Years) (CD/MC, Zone Records, 1997)
 Iris Athenaeum – Vol. I (CD/MC, Zone Records, 2000)
 Iris Athenaeum – Vol. II (CD/MC, Zone Records, 2000)

Compilations 
 The Best of Iris (CD, Electrecord, 1993)
 Muzică de colecție, Vol. 22 – Iris (Collection Music, Vol. 22 – Iris) (CD, Roton, 2007, with Jurnalul Național newspaper) 
 Legenda merge mai departe (The Legend Goes On) (CD, Roton, 2009, with Adevărul newspaper)

Video albums 
 Iris Digital Athenaeum (DVD/VHS, Zone Records, 2001) (reissued in 2010)
 Iris Aeterna – Dăruind vei dobândi (Iris Aeterna – Giving You Will Acquire) (DVD, Roton, 2010)

Box sets 
 Integrala Iris (21xCD, Roton, 2009) (1984–2007 discography reissue)

Tribute albums 
 Trooper: Gloria – Tribut pentru Iris (The Glory – Tribute to Iris) (CD, self-released, 2006)

Books 
 Miron Ghiu Caia: Iris: spectacolul abia începe (Iris: The Show Is Just Beginning) (Humanitas, Muzzak Collection, 2003)

Awards 
 2006: MTV Romanian Music Awards – Best Rock

References

Bibliography
 Miron Ghiu-Caia. Iris: spectacolul abia începe (Iris: The Show Is Just Beginning) (Humanitas, Muzzak Collection, 2003). ISBN 973-50-0477-1

External links
 Iris—Nelu Dumitrescu – Official site
 Iris discography on Discogs

Interviews (in Romanian)
 "Avem o energie extraordinară și cântăm mai bine ca acum 15 ani", Iulian Ignat, Formula AS, nr. 361/1999
 25 de ani de "Formula... Unu", Formula AS, nr. 502/2002
 VIDEO „E normal să nu mai fim unica supapă de distracție“, 18 noiembrie 2010, Ruxandra Grecu, Adevărul
 Valter Popa, chitaristul de la Iris: "Prima mea chitară era din tablă și semăna cu o tigaie", 13 decembrie 2011, Evenimentul zilei
 Cristi Minculescu vorbește despre albumul IRIS 35 de ani, 12 aprilie 2012, Info Music

Musical groups established in 1977
Romanian rock music groups
Romanian heavy metal musical groups
1977 establishments in Romania
Musical groups from Bucharest